Joëlle Frébault is a French Polynesian politician. She is a Member of the Assembly of French Polynesia and the first woman elected elected mayor of the Marquesas Islands.

Biography 
Frébault was the elected representative of the Marquesas Islands to the French Polynesia Assembly. In March 2020 she was elected mayor of the Marquesas Islands, becoming the first woman to hold the position.

In January 2022 she was awarded the Ordre national du Mérite.

References

Living people
Year of birth missing (living people)
People from the Marquesas Islands
Members of the Assembly of French Polynesia
French Polynesian women in politics
Tapura Huiraatira politicians
Mayors of places in French Polynesia
Recipients of the Ordre national du Mérite